Mill Covered Bridge may refer to:

Mill Covered Bridge (Belvidere, Vermont), listed on the National Register of Historic Places in Lamoille County, Vermont
Mill Covered Bridge (Tunbridge, Vermont), listed on the National Register of Historic Places in Orange County, Vermont